Carol Geary Schneider was president of the Association of American Colleges and Universities from 1998 to 2016.

Schneider received her B.A. in history from Mount Holyoke College, Phi Beta Kappa, magna cum laude in 1967.  She received her Ph.D. in history from Harvard University and taught  at the University of Chicago, DePaul University, Chicago State University and Boston University.

She has served in the past as a member of the Board of Trustees at Mount Holyoke.

External links
 AAC&U Biography
 List of articles by Schneider from "LookSmart"

Year of birth missing (living people)
Living people
Harvard University alumni
University of Chicago faculty
DePaul University faculty
Chicago State University faculty
Boston University faculty
Mount Holyoke College alumni